Dubtronica is electronic music influenced by dub music. Early examples from the 1980s are the experimental English dub of On-U Sound Records and Mad Professor. It is also called simply "dub" or "techdub".

Dubtronica consists of electronic beats played in a downbeat manner. It is much lower in speed than techno and generally warmer than dance-oriented electronica. Some tracks use reggae toasters or singers to produce a more accessible form of the music.

References 

Electronic music genres
English styles of music
Fusion music genres